The Onyas are an Australian punk rock band which formed in 1991 in Brisbane. The members are John "Mad Macka" McKeering (vocals, guitar) and the brothers Richard "Stanners" Stanley (bass) and Jordan "Jaws" Stanley (drum).

On 19 October 1996 they supported the Sex Pistols on their Filthy Lucre Tour, at the Festival Hall in Melbourne.

They made five international tours, with three to Europe (1996, 1997 and 1998), and two to the United States (1997 and 2000).

In 2006 John McKeering also joined Melbourne band Cosmic Psychos on guitar, after the death of Robert John "Rocket" Watts.

In 2016 the band celebrated its 25 year anniversary with a concert on 1 April at The Tote, Melbourne.

Members 

Current line-up
 John McKeering – vocals, guitar
 Richard Stanley – bass
 Jordan Stanley – drum

Occasional line-ups

1992

 John McKeering – vocals, guitar
 Anton Bladwell – guitar
 Richard Stanley – bass
 Jordan Stanley – drum

1997

 John McKeering – vocals, guitar
 José Bernardo "Joseber" Tolosa – guitar
 Richard Stanley – bass
 Jordan Stanley – drum

Discography

Cassettes

 Brack (1991) – Self-editing

Albums

 Get Shitfaced With The Onyas (1996) – Au-Go-Go
 Six! (1998) – Au-Go-Go

Live albums

 Heterospective (2000) – Dropkick

Singles

 "Beer Gut" (1994) – Au-Go-Go
 "Live For Rejection" (1994) – Lance Rock
 "London... Paris... Bracken Ridge!" (1997) –  1 + 2
 "Live For Rejection" (1996) – Man's Ruin
 "Hit You Up The Guts" (1996) – Rock & Roll Inc.
 "Drink 'Em Up Motherfuckers!" (1998) –  Sheep
 "Three More Hits From The Onyas" (1999) – Junk
 "Admission Of A Lifestyle" (2000) – Dropkick

Splits

 With Big Bongin' Baby: "The Onyas & Big Bongin' Baby" (1994) – Destroyer
 With The Rockford Files: "Pissin' & Peckin' With The Onyas" (1995) – Knuckledrag

Further reading

External links
The Onyas celebrate their 25th anniversary at The Beat
Interview with John McKeering at Sseennsseess blog
Interview with Richard Stanley at The Music
Interview with The Onyas at Ox Fanzine (in German)
Interview with John McKeering at Ruta 66 (in Spanish)

Musical groups from Brisbane
Australian punk rock groups
Man's Ruin Records artists
Au Go Go Records artists